Vasilios Troumpoulos (born 23 December 2003) is a Greek professional footballer who plays as a midfielder for Super League 2 club AEK Athens B.

References

2003 births
Living people
Super League Greece players
PAS Lamia 1964 players
Association football midfielders
Footballers from Athens
Greek footballers